Uwe Dünkel (born 3 November 1960 in Gera, East Germany) is a German former racewalker who competed in the 1980 Summer Olympics.

References

1960 births
Living people
Sportspeople from Gera
People from Bezirk Gera
East German male racewalkers
Olympic athletes of East Germany
Athletes (track and field) at the 1980 Summer Olympics